Dingelstedt may refer to:-

People

Franz von Dingelstedt

Places

Dingelstedt in Saxony-Anhalt